Piti may refer to:
 Pīti, a mental factor in Buddhism
 PITI, the principal, interest, taxes, and insurance sum of a mortgage payment
 Piti (food), a soup dish of the South Caucasus and Central Asia
 Piti (footballer) (born 1981), Spanish footballer
 Piti, Guam
 Piti language, a language of Nigeria
 P'iti or Piti, a mountain in the Lima Region, Peru

See also
 Piti Guns, a heritage site in Piti, Guam